Grand Lake is a  lake in Presque Isle County in the U.S. state of Michigan.
  
Fishing species include: bluegill, bullhead catfish, northern pike, garpike, bowfin, pumpkinseed sunfish, rock bass, smallmouth bass, white sucker, yellow perch, and walleye.

The lake lies on the landward side of a prominent promontory in the county that juts out into Lake Huron, thereby making the promontory almost an island and indirectly giving the promontory and county their name of "Presque Isle."  The lake contains many islands, such as Brown Island, Grand Island, and Macombers Island.

The two Presque Isle, Michigan lighthouses are nearby to the east: the New Presque Isle Lighthouse at 4500 E. Grand Lake Road and the Old Presque Isle Lighthouse at 5295 Grand Lake Road.

Deposits of Rock salt were discovered at a depth of 1284 feet in the vicinity of Grand Lake.  On the west shore of the lake are ledges, which rise to a height of 40 feet above lake level, and include Cerepatora fossils along with crinoid stems.

See also
List of lakes in Michigan

References

Further reading
 Clarke Historical Library, Central Michigan University, Bibliography on Presque Isle County
 Kauffman, George H. "My Recollections of Early Grand Lake." n.p., 1973.

External links
Michigan DNR Map of Grand Lake

Lakes of Michigan
Bodies of water of Presque Isle County, Michigan